The second season of My Hero Academia anime television series was produced by Bones and directed by Kenji Nagasaki, with Yōsuke Kuroda handling series composition, Yoshihiko Umakoshi providing character designs and Yuki Hayashi composed the music. Like the first season, it adapts Kōhei Horikoshi's original manga series of the same name from the rest of the 3rd volume through the end of the 8th volume over 25 episodes. It covers the "U.A. Sports Festival" (chapters 22–44), "Vs. Hero Killer" (chapters 45–59), and "Final Exams" arcs (chapters 60–69), with the exception of episode 13.5 (recap) and chapter 70 (which is the separate storyline from the season arcs).

The season follows Izuku Midoriya, who had given a chance to show off his Quirk along with his classmates in the Sports Festival, in which the Pro Heroes can hire them as their internships. Later, things are getting worse in Hosu City as the Hero Killer: Stain appears, eventually leading to a confrontation with the League of Villains and the young Hero interns. As the first semester nearly approached its end, the Class 1-A students facing off against their teachers in combat during the final exams. While facing their adversity, Izuku and Bakugo must put their differences aside in facing against their idol.

The season ran from April 1 to September 30, 2017, on ytv and NTV in Japan, and Toho released the season on DVD and Blu-ray in eight compilations, each containing two to four episodes, between July 19, 2017, and February 14, 2018. Funimation licensed the season for an English-language release in North America and released it in two compilations on April 3 and June 5, 2018. Like the previous season, FunimationNow, Crunchyroll and Hulu are streaming the season outside of Asia as it airs. Animax Asia is simulcasting the season in the same day it airs. Funimation's adaptation ran from August 11, 2018, to February 24, 2019, on Adult Swim's Toonami block.

The second season makes use of four pieces of theme music: two opening themes and two ending themes.



Episode list

Home video release

Japanese
Toho released the second season of the anime on DVD and Blu-ray in eight volumes in Japan, with the first volume being released on July 19, 2017, and the final volume being released on February 14, 2018.

English
Funimation released the series in North America in two volumes, with the first volume being released on April 3, 2018, and the second volume released on June 5, 2018. Both volumes received a limited edition combo release, a standard edition combo release, and a standard edition DVD release. Sony Pictures UK distributed the series in the United Kingdom and Ireland, and released the series on standard edition DVD and Blu-ray volumes on April 2, 2018, and June 11, 2018. Manga Entertainment later released the series in the United Kingdom and Ireland for Funimation as a complete set on September 21, 2020. Universal Sony distributed the series in Australia and New Zealand, and initially released the series in limited edition volumes on May 9, 2018, and June 13, 2018, and on standard edition volumes on August 15, 2018. Funimation later released the series in Australia and New Zealand through Madman Entertainment, with the combo releases for part 1 and 2 being scheduled for December 4, 2019.

Notes

References

My Hero Academia episode lists
2017 Japanese television seasons